Hope Island railway station is a planned railway station on the Gold Coast Line in Queensland, Australia. It  will serve the Gold Coast suburbs of Helensvale, Hope Island and Oxenford, and will be located between Coomera and Helensvale stations.

History 

In November 2017, the Queensland Government committed to building three new in-fill stations on the Gold Coast Line as part of the AU$5.4 billion Cross River Rail project – Pimpama, Helensvale North and Merrimac. In August 2021, Helensvale North station was renamed Hope Island as the result of community feedback.

It is currently anticipated that approximately 2,800 passengers will use Hope Island station per day when it becomes operational. The station is expected to cost up to $40 million to construct, and is planned to be open by 2024, in time for the commencement of services on the new Cross River Rail line.

The planned location for the station is off Hope Island Road, near Mangrove Jack Park and just south of the Coomera River. The station will be integrated with other modes of public transport, and is planned to feature connections with pedestrian and bicycle paths. The station concept design currently includes space for 174 car park bays.

References

External links 

Railway stations in Gold Coast City
Proposed railway stations in Australia

Railway stations scheduled to open in 2024